Alex Michelsen (born August 25, 2004) is an American tennis player.

Michelsen has a career high ATP singles ranking of No. 356 achieved on 27 February 2023. He also has a career high ATP doubles ranking of No. 693 achieved on 6 February 2023. He won the singles and doubles title at the 2022 Easter Bowl, becoming the first American champion in both disciplines since Donald Young in 2006. He also won the 2022 Wimbledon Championships – Boys' doubles title. He is committed to play college tennis at the University of Georgia.

ATP Challenger and ITF Futures finals

Singles: 5 (2–3)

Doubles: 2 (1–1)

Junior Grand Slam finals

Doubles: 2 (1 title, 1 runners-up)

References

External links

2004 births
Living people
American male tennis players
People from Laguna Beach, California
Wimbledon junior champions
Grand Slam (tennis) champions in boys' doubles
21st-century American people
Tennis people from California